No. 227 Squadron RAF was a Royal Air Force Squadron that formed as bomber unit in World War I and World War II.

History

Formation and World War I
No. 227 Squadron was formed on 1 April 1918 as a day bomber unit and operated former RNAS  Capronis from Pizzone, Italy, but it did not become operational and it disbanded on 9 December 1918.

Reformation in World War II
227 squadron was formed in Dec 1941. Personal sailed from Glagow in the ss. Viceroy of India on 4 January 1942 in convoy. The convoy was attacked by submarines in the North Atlantic about 11 January. One of the Castle ships was hit and left for the Azores. After four weeks the first port of call was Freetown.  The next port of call was Durban. The entire personnel marched through Durban to the Town Hall where a Scotsman from 221 sang to the crowd after speeches by local dignitaries.  After four days the convoy split. Some ships headed for the Far Easf. 227 squadron headed North unaccompanied and anchored at Aden for about 3 days. A Russian ship was anchored nearby and entertained the crew from a distance with some Russian songs.   The Viceroy docked at Suez on 4 March. 227 disembarked and camped  in tents at RAF. Kasfareet. Personal were employed attached to the MU assembling aircraft in temperatures that reached 129 degrees F.

After a few weeks 227 equipped with about 16 Beaufighters moved to RAF Gianakalas in the Western Desert and went straight into action against Rommel's advance under its CO, Squadron Leader O'Reilly.....he was an Irishman known  Mad Mick. Within a few weeks after heavy losses of aircraft, personnel were evacuated in lorry convoy to Palestine camping at RAF Aqir awaiting the arrival of some Halifax. Bombers from the UK (No 10 and No 76 squadron). Of the 17 taking off from East Anglia only about 10 arrived - all too late to take part in the intended relief of Malta.  

Bombers of 10 Squadron pending the arrival of Bristol Beaufighters. The squadron merged with 76 Squadron and 462 Squadron. On 20 August 1942, Beaufighters at Luqa, Malta were named 227 Squadron and the unit then moved to Egypt, Libya and Italy. On 12 August 1944, it was renumbered 19 Squadron, South African Air Force. 
It reformed again at RAF Bardney on 7 October 1944 and flew Lancasters against Germany. No. 227 Squadron was based at RAF Balderton, Nottinghamshire with Avro Lancasters between October 1944 - April 1945. 227 Squadron moved to RAF Strubby, Lincolnshire on 5 April 1945, then in June to RAF Graveley, where it was finally disbanded on 5 September.

Aircraft operated

References

External links

 History of No.'s 226–230 Squadrons at RAF Web
 227 Squadron history on the official RAF website

227
Military units and formations established in 1918
1918 establishments in the United Kingdom